Leon William Kennedy Bignell (born 1966), Australian politician, is the member for Mawson representing the South Australian Branch of the Australian Labor Party since the 2006 election.

Background

Bignell was a high-profile ABC sports reporter and later a media adviser to Pat Conlon.

Political career
Bignell finished ahead of incumbent Liberal member Robert Brokenshire with a 52.2 percent two party preferred vote at the 2006 state election, delivering Mawson to Labor for the first time since it was lost in the 1993 election landslide. He increased his two-party-preferred vote to 54.4 percent at the 2010 election, bucking not only the statewide trend, but decades of voting patterns in the seat. Mawson was Labor's second most marginal seat, and on paper it should have been among the first to be lost to the Liberals in the event of a uniform swing large enough to topple Labor from office. Bignell's victory was critical in allowing Labor to eke out a narrow two-seat majority.

Bignell increased his majority to 55.6 percent at the 2014 election, again against the statewide trend.

The 2016 draft redistribution ahead of the 2018 election proposed to redistribute Bignell's seat of Mawson from a 5.6 percent Labor seat to a notional 2.6 percent Liberal seat, taking in areas down the coast as well as Kangaroo Island.

Bignell is affectionately known as "Biggles" in media circles, and was once caught drawing caricatures of his opposition colleagues while in the chamber. Bignell was engaged to Labor colleague and former member for Bright Chloë Fox between March 2006 and March 2007.

Bignell entered cabinet in January 2013 as the Minister for Agriculture, Food and Fisheries, Minister for Forests, Minister for Tourism, Minister for Recreation and Sport and Minister for Racing in the Weatherill Labor cabinet until the 2018 state election.

He is aligned with Labor's left faction.

References

External links

Parliamentary Profile: SA Labor website
 

1966 births
Living people
Members of the South Australian House of Assembly
Australian Labor Party members of the Parliament of South Australia
Labor Left politicians
21st-century Australian politicians